This is the discography of pop/R&B singer Kat DeLuna. DeLuna first rose to fame in 2007, when she released her debut single "Whine Up". The single became one of the most played songs on pop radio that summer, and achieved major success worldwide, reaching the top ten in countries such as Belgium and France. The single also became a smash hit in the US, peaking inside the top forty of the Hot 100 single chart, as well as topped the Hot Dance Club Play chart. The single led to the release of DeLuna's debut album, 9 Lives in the Fall of 2007. The album was met to generally positive critical reception. The album debuted at number 58 in the US, and charted within the top twenty of countries such as Belgium and Poland.

In 2008, DeLuna began work on her second studio album. The album spawned several official and promotional singles. The first of these was "Unstoppable", which became a minor hit in Canada. The song was featured in the film Confessions of a Shopaholic, as well as its accompanying soundtrack. It was followed by the second promotional single "Dance Bailalo", which became a major hit on the US Hot Dance Club Play chart. DeLuna's second album, titled Inside Out later spawned the official singles "Push Push", "Party O'Clock" and "Dancing Tonight". After much delay, Inside Out was released in Belgium on November 5, 2010. It received commercial success, reaching the top twenty of the Belgium album chart. The album is currently released only in some European markets (Belgium, France, Poland). Inside Out was also released in Japan on July 13, 2011. A third studio album, Loading appeared in 2016, a deluxe edition as EP Loading (Japanese Edition) has arrived in the same year.

Albums

Studio albums

Mixtapes

Extended plays

Singles

As lead artist

As featured artist

Promotional singles

Other appearances

Music videos

Guest appearances

Notes
A  Not released in the US.
B  "Cut Off Time" did not enter the Billboard Hot 100 but peaked on the Bubbling Under Hot 100 Singles chart at number twenty-three.
C  "Run the Show" did not enter the Billboard Hot 100 but peaked on the Bubbling Under Hot 100 Singles chart at number seventeen.

References

Discographies of American artists
Pop music discographies
Reggae discographies
Rhythm and blues discographies